Southern Baptist Sissies is a 2013 American drama film written and directed by Del Shores. It is based on Shores's 2000 play of the same name.

Plot
Based in a small town in Texas, four boys named Mark, Benny, TJ, and Andrew retell their experiences of discovering their homosexuality while being raised in a conservative Baptist church. The film is a satirical comedy and a serious exploration of what it means to be gay.

Cast

Reception
The film has a 60% approval rating on Rotten Tomatoes based on five reviews, with an average score of 6.13/10.

References

External links

2013 films
2010s English-language films
2010s American films
American drama films
American films based on plays
American LGBT-related films
Films set in Texas
LGBT-related drama films
2013 LGBT-related films